Harry Oliver Bradley (November 24, 1929 – March 16, 1990) was a Canadian politician and teacher. He was elected to the House of Commons of Canada in the 1962 election as a Member of the Progressive Conservative Party for the riding of Northumberland. He was defeated in the 1963 election.

References

1929 births
1990 deaths
Members of the House of Commons of Canada from Ontario
Progressive Conservative Party of Canada MPs